Ettore Spalletti (26 January 1940 – 11 October 2019) was an Italian artist. He exhibited at Documenta in 1982 and 1992 and represented Italy at the Venice Biennale in 1997. Spalletti was mostly known for his light blue monochrome paintings that he created on different surfaces and for his creative use of light. Spalletti lived and worked for all his life in his birthplace Cappelle sul Tavo in Abruzzo.

Selected exhibitions
 1982: Documenta VII
 1991: Musée d'Art Moderne de la Ville de Paris
 1992: Documenta IX
 1993: Solomon R. Guggenheim Museum (with Haim Steinbach)
1997: 47th Venice Biennale
 2009: Museum Kurhaus Kleve
 2014: Jointed exhibition at MAXXI, Rome; Museo d'arte contemporanea Donnaregina, Naples; and Galleria civica d'arte moderna e contemporanea, Bergamo.

References

Italian contemporary artists
1940 births
2019 deaths
People from the Province of Pescara
20th-century Italian male artists
21st-century Italian male artists